Kiến Thành may refer to several places in Vietnam:

Kiến Thành, An Giang, a rural commune of Chợ Mới District, An Giang Province
, a rural commune of Đăk R'Lấp District

See also
 Kiên Thành (disambiguation)